Mount Alice Gade is a mainly ice-covered mountain over 3,400 m, marking the northeast extremity of the Rawson Plateau in the Queen Maud Mountains. It was discovered in November 1911 by Captain Roald Amundsen, and named by him for one of the daughters of the Norwegian minister (ambassador) and consul-general to Brazil, a strong supporter of Amundsen.

Further reading 
 United States. Defense Mapping Agency. Hydrographic Center, Sailing Directions for Antarctica: Including the Off-lying Islands South of Latitude 60°, P 215

External links 

 Mount Alice Gade on USGS website
 Mount Alice Gade on AADC website
 הר Mount Alice Gade on SCAR website
 Mount Alice Gade on peakbagger
 Mount Alice Gade on peakery

References 

Mountains of the Ross Dependency
Amundsen Coast